DarkTek Sourcebook is a supplement published by Game Designers' Workshop in 1991 for the near-future horror role-playing game Dark Conspiracy.

Contents
DarkTek Sourcebook, written by Charles E. Gannon, with cover art by John Zeleznik, describes new items for a Dark Conspiracy campaign, including the biologic weapons used by the Dark Minions, the constructs used by the ETs, and the advanced technology used by humans.

Reception
In the September 1992 edition of Dragon (Issue #185), Allen Varney thought that this book "shows a shivery imagination that conveys the game’s flavor better than the rulebook did." Varney concluded with a thumbs up, saying, "Put an Obedience Bug (page 16) in your referee’s ear and compel him to get this book."

Reviews
 Casus Belli #69 (May 1992)

References

Role-playing game supplements introduced in 1991
Science fiction role-playing game supplements